Antje Gleichfeld (née Braasch on 31 March 1938) is a retired German middle-distance runner.

Biography
Gleichfeld's father was killed on the fronts of World War II, and she had to take odd jobs from the age of six to help support her family. As a teenager she played handball before changing to athletics.

Competing in the 800 m Gleichfeld finished fifth at the Olympic Games in 1960 and 1964; she won a bronze medal at the 1966 European Championships. She also won three medals at the Universiade; a gold in 1961 and silver medals in 1963 and 1965. At the 1969 European Championships she won a bronze medal in the 4 × 400 m relay, together with teammates Christa Czekay, Inge Eckhoff and Christel Frese.

Domestically she represented the sports club LG Alstertal-Garstedt. She became West German 800 m outdoor champion in 1961, 1963, 1964, 1965 and 1966, and indoor champion in 1962 and 1965. In the 400 metres she became West German champion in 1965.

Gleichfeld set three world records: in the 800 m indoor in 1965 (2:07.1), in the 4 × 400 m relay in 1969 (3:33.9) and in the 3×800 m relay in 1967 (6:21.0), as well as one European and eight national records. In 1964 she became the first German woman to run 800 m faster than 2:05 minutes. The same year she was awarded the Silver Bay Leaf by the German Track and Field Association. She married Detlev Gleichfeld, also a middle-distance runner.

References

1938 births
Living people
West German female sprinters
West German female middle-distance runners
Athletes (track and field) at the 1960 Summer Olympics
Athletes (track and field) at the 1964 Summer Olympics
Olympic athletes of the United Team of Germany
Olympic athletes of West Germany
Athletes from Hamburg
European Athletics Championships medalists
Universiade medalists in athletics (track and field)
Universiade gold medalists for West Germany
Medalists at the 1959 Summer Universiade
Medalists at the 1961 Summer Universiade
Medalists at the 1963 Summer Universiade